The bar-bellied pitta (Hydrornis elliotii) is a species of bird in the family Pittidae. It is found in Cambodia, Laos, Thailand, and Vietnam.  Its natural habitat is seasonal tropical forest.

Gallery

References

bar-bellied pitta
Birds of Laos
Birds of Cambodia
Birds of Vietnam
bar-bellied pitta
Taxonomy articles created by Polbot